The Roman Catholic Diocese of Araçuaí is a diocese located in the city of Araçuaí in the Ecclesiastical province of Diamantina in Brazil.

According to biographical information contained in the Vatican Press Office's News.va and Vatican Information Service's (VIS) daily bulletins (in the section regarding episcopal appointments) for Wednesday, June 13, 2012, Pope Benedict XVI appointed the Reverend Father Marcello Romano, a member of the clergy of, and at the time the Diocesan Administrator of, the Roman Catholic Diocese of Guanhaes, as the ninth Bishop of Araçuaí. For more information on the then Bishop-elect of this Diocese, please see the two news releases.

History
 August 25, 1913: Established as Diocese of Araçuaí from the Diocese of Diamantina

Bishops
 Bishops of Araçuaí (Latin Rite)
 Serafim Gomes Jardim da Silva (1914.03.12 – 1934.05.26), appointed Archbishop of Diamantina, Minas Gerais
 José de Haas, O.F.M. (1937.03.20 – 1956.08.01)
 José Maria Pires (1957.05.25 – 1965.12.02), appointed Archbishop of Paraíba
 Altivo Pacheco Ribeiro (1966.06.27 – 1973.11.10)
 Silvestre Luís Scandián, S.V.D. (1975.01.04 – 1981.08.18), appointed Coadjutor Archbishop of Vitória, Espirito Santo
 Crescênzio Rinaldini (1982.05.10 – 2001.08.08)
 Dario Campos, O.F.M. (2001.08.08 – 2004.06.23), appointed Bishop of Leopoldina, Minas Gerais; future Archbishop
 Severino Clasen, O.F.M. (2005.05.11 – 2011.07.06), appointed Bishop of Caçador, Santa Catarina
 Marcello Romano (2012.06.13 - 2020.03.25)

Coadjutor bishop
Dario Campos, O.F.M. (2000-2001)

References

 GCatholic.org
 Catholic Hierarchy

Roman Catholic dioceses in Brazil
Christian organizations established in 1913
Aracuai, Roman Catholic Diocese of
Roman Catholic dioceses and prelatures established in the 20th century
1913 establishments in Brazil